This is a very incomplete list of Gaelic footballers who have played at senior level for the Armagh county team.

List of players

A–L
 Francie Bellew: Until 2009
 Jarlath Burns
 Rónán Clarke
 Brendan Donaghy: for 17 years, until 2022
 Paul Hearty: For 12 years, until 2012
 Ger Houlahan
 Aaron Kernan: For a decade, until 2014
 Joe Kernan

M
 Oisín McConville
 Jim McCorry
 Steven McDonnell: 1999–2012
 John McEntee
 Tony McEntee
 Kieran McGeeney: For 17 years, until 2007
 Paul McGrane: Until 2009
 Colum McKinstry
 Enda McNulty
 Justin McNulty
 Andy Mallon: For 14 years, until 2017
 Seamus Mallon
 Diarmaid Marsden: 1993–2005, 117 appearances
 Paddy Moriarty
 Alf Murray

N–Z
 Aidan O'Rourke: Until 2006
 Benny Tierney

References

Players
 
Lists of inter-county Gaelic football players